Stars Like Fleas is a Brooklyn-based band formed by multi-instrumentalist Shannon Fields and vocalist Montgomery Knott in the winter of 1998. Frequently compared to later Talk Talk and Robert Wyatt, their music blends avant-jazz and free improvisation with electronic textures and several overdubbed murmured vocal lines.

History
The band started in 1998. On their albums and in live performances, Fields and Knott have recruited a host of other musicians, including members and ex-members of Other Dimensions in Music, TEST, No-Neck Blues Band, Papa M, Out Hud, Gold Sparkle Band, At the Drive-In, Beirut, Tall Firs, TV on the Radio, Celebration, Fiery Furnaces, The Silent League, and Mercury Rev. In 2007 they did a Take-Away Show video session shot by Vincent Moon.

Members
 Shannon Fields - producer
 Montgomery Knott - vocals
 Ryan Smith - piano, synthesizers, laptop, many other things
 Ryan Sawyer - drums, percussion
 Matt Lavelle - bass clarinet, flugelhorn, trumpet, cuica
 Sam Amidon - fiddle, banjo, voice
 Jon Natchez - reeds, brass, strings, keys, etc.
 Gerald Menke - pedal steel, dobro resonator, guitars
 Shelley Burgon - harp, laptop, baritone guitar
 Tianna Kennedy - cello
 Shayna Dulberger - bass
 Laura Ortman - violin

Discography 
 Took the Ass for a Drive (1999; digitally re-released by File 13 2007, downloadable at iTunes)
 Sun Lights Down on the Fence (2003, Praemedia)
 The Ken Burns Effect (2007, Talitres Records in Europe) (May 20, 2008 Hometapes, distribution via Absolutely Kosher/Misra)

References

External links 
 Official site (Hometapes)
 Official site (Praemedia)
 Official Site (Talitres Records)
 MySpace Page
 [ Allmusic Guide Entry]
 Video of a Stars Like Fleas Performance

Interviews 
 from Splendid eZine Interview with Shannon Fields and Montgomery Knott by Mike Meginnis

Indie rock musical groups from New York (state)
Musical groups from Brooklyn
Musical groups established in 1998
1998 establishments in New York City